Peter "Rio" Moyo (born 8 May 1988) is a Zimbabwean professional footballer, who plays as a midfielder for Harare City.

Career

Club
He started his playing career at the local team Quelaton and earned his first international cap when he played for Highlanders in the Zimbabwe Premier Soccer League. On 30 May 2014, it was announced that he had signed with Premier Soccer League side Mpumalanga Black Aces in South Africa, along with Ghanaian centre-back Kwabena Adusei. However, Moyo left the Black Aces in December 2014 after failing to appear for the club in any competition. After departing the Black Aces, Moyo signed for Witbank Spurs.

International
In January 2014, coach Ian Gorowa, invited him to be a part of the Zimbabwe squad for the 2014 African Nations Championship. He helped the team to a fourth-place finish after being defeated by Nigeria by a goal to nil. In March 2014, Moyo scored his first international goal in a friendly versus Malawi.

Albums
Mushonga Mukuru (2013)

Mabasa Amwari (2015)

Mapao Mokonzi (2017)

Mwana WeMurozvi (2019)

Career statistics

Club
.

International
.

International goals
. Scores and results list Zimbabwe's goal tally first.

Honours

Club
Highlanders
Cup of Zimbabwe (1): 2013

References

External links

Peter Moyo at Footballdatabase

Living people
1988 births
Sportspeople from Bulawayo
Zimbabwean footballers
Zimbabwe international footballers
Mpumalanga Black Aces F.C. players
Highlanders F.C. players
Witbank Spurs F.C. players
How Mine F.C. players
CAPS United players
Harare City F.C. players
National First Division players
Zimbabwean expatriate footballers
Expatriate soccer players in South Africa
Zimbabwean expatriate sportspeople in South Africa
Zimbabwe A' international footballers
2014 African Nations Championship players
Association football midfielders